, also written as 2005 NB56, is a near-Earth asteroid of the Apollo group. In 2009, research physicist Edward Drobyshevski and colleagues have suggested that  could be a possible source of the meteoroid that caused the Tunguska event on 30 June 1908. It has been also suspected to be a dormant comet.

Possible source of the Tunguska event bolide
One study "suggests that a chunk of a comet caused the 5-10 megaton fireball, bouncing off the atmosphere and back into orbit around the sun."

This object made a close approach to Earth when it was discovered in 2005 and will do so again in 2045.  This object has a poorly known orbit and was only observed over an observation arc of 17 days, not sufficient to predict its position in 1908 with sufficient accuracy.

References

External links 
 

Minor planet object articles (unnumbered)
20050711